Kannathal is a 1998 Indian Tamil-language devotional film directed by Bharathi Kannan. This flim was a super hit at box office. The film stars Karan, Neena and Indhu, with Manivannan, Vadivelu, Vadivukkarasi, Fathima Babu, and Delhi Ganesh playing supporting roles. It was released on 2 December 1998.

Plot
Kannatha (Neena) is a goddess believer and is treated as a goddess by the villagers. She lives with her father Shanmugam Pillai (Delhi Ganesh), who is a nadaswaram player and an ardent believer of a goddess, her mother (Fathima Babu), and her four little sisters.

Chinna Durai (Karan) is the son of the rich Zamindar Mohana Sundaram (Manivannan) and Ranganayaki (Vadivukkarasi). He is a womanizer and has a lot of bad habits. One day, Chinna Durai witnesses Kannatha in a Hindu festival and wants to have sex with her, so he decides to marry her. Shanmugam, who is in deep debt, accepts for the marriage. Chinna Durai and Kannatha finally marry.

After the marriage, Chinna Durai rapes Kannatha and begins to mistreat the innocent girl. When Shanmugam comes to see Kannatha, Chinna Durai ridicules him. Feeling guilty to have destroyed his daughter's life, Shanmugam dies from a heart attack. Kannatha then decides to accommodate her mother and sisters in their big house. Mohana Sundaram and Ranganayaki humiliate them as much as possible to expel them from their house; in addition to this, Chinna Durai sexually harasses Kannatha's mother. They cannot bear the mental torture, so Kannatha's mother and the four girls commit suicide by eating poisoned food.

Kannatha doesn't know the news of her family's death. Meanwhile, Kannatha becomes  pregnant. In eager to spoil another woman's life they accuse that Kannatha's baby is someone else baby, The village president (in order of chonnadurai) demands Kannatha should perform a ritual on front of Chintala karai Vekkali amman statue if she does the ritual without aborting the baby, she is a good woman. Kannatha performs the ritual successfully.One night, Chinna Durai, Mohana Sundaram, and Ranganayaki beat the crap out of the innocent girl to death and incinerate her. They claim that this was an accident to the police. Later, Chinna Durai marries his relative Seetha Lakshmi (Indhu), a talkative and naive village girl. Later, Kannatha becomes a goddess and takes revenge on the culprits. What transpires later forms the crux of the story.

Cast

Karan as Chinna Durai
Neena as Kannatha
Indhu as Seetha Lakshmi
Manivannan as Mohana Sundaram
Vadivukkarasi as Ranganayaki
Vadivelu as Soona Paana (Subbaiya Pandiyan) 
Fathima Babu as Kannatha's mother
Delhi Ganesh as Shanmugam, Kannatha's father
Halwa Vasu as Vasu
Thideer Kannaiah as Gopal
Bharathi Kannan as Babu
Meesai Murugesan
Kullamani
Raj Chander as Babu
Nellai Siva
Kovai Senthil
Chitra Guptan
Vellai Subbaiah
Achan
Vinu Chakravarthy in a guest appearance as Karuppu Sami
Khushbu in a guest appearance as villupattukari

Soundtrack

The film score and the soundtrack were composed by Ilaiyaraaja. The soundtrack, released in 1998, features 7 tracks with lyrics written by Kamakodiyan, Ponnadiyan, Arivumathi, Ilaiyaraaja and Bharathi Kannan.

Reception
D. C. Ramanujam of The Hindu opined that "The old fashioned approach of director S. Bharathikannan, based on his story and screenplay, may go well with rural audience, particularly womenfolk".

References

1998 films
1990s Tamil-language films
Films scored by Ilaiyaraaja
Hindu devotional films
Super Good Films films
Films directed by Bharathi Kannan